The first Locomotives of the Great Western Railway (GWR) were specified by Isambard Kingdom Brunel but Daniel Gooch was soon appointed as the railway's Locomotive Superintendent. He designed several different  broad gauge types for the growing railway, such as the Firefly and later Iron Duke Class 2-2-2s. In 1864 Gooch was succeeded by Joseph Armstrong who brought his standard gauge experience to the workshops at Swindon. To replace some of the earlier locomotives, he put broad gauge wheels on his standard gauge locomotives and from this time on all locomotives were given numbers, including the broad gauge ones that had previously carried just names.

Joseph Armstrong's early death in 1877 meant that the next phase of motive power design was the responsibility of William Dean, his assistant and successor. Dean went on to develop express 4-4-0 types, but the familiar 4-6-0s of later years were initially introduced by the next engineer, George Jackson Churchward. He was also responsible for the introduction of self-propelled Steam Rail Motors for suburban and light branch line passenger trains. Next came Charles Collett in 1921; he standardised the many types of locomotives then in service, producing the iconic Castle and Kings. He also introduced diesel power in the form of streamlined rail cars in 1934. The final engineer was Frederick Hawksworth who took control in 1941 and produced GWR-design locomotives until after nationalisation in 1948.

The GWR expanded rapidly from 1854 by amalgamating with other railways. In 1876 most of the remaining broad gauge companies became a part of the GWR. The Railways Act 1921 finally brought most of the remaining independent companies in the area under its control. Many early locomotives were replaced by standard GWR designs, but many others were rebuilt using standardised components.

Livery

For most of the period of its existence, the GWR painted its locomotives a middle chrome green. They initially had Indian red frames but this was later changed to black. Name and numberplates were generally of polished brass with a black background, and chimneys often had copper rims or "caps".

Great Western Railway locomotives

Isambard Kingdom Brunel (1835 - 1837)
The GWR's first locomotives were specified by Isambard Kingdom Brunel but did not prove too successful. In order to meet his demands some novel ideas were tried such as the Haigh Foundry's geared locomotives and TE Harrison's Hurricane and Thunderer which had the engine and boiler on separate chassis.

 Haigh Foundry 2-2-2s – Snake and Viper
 R and W Hawthorn locomotives –  Hurricane and Thunderer
 Mather, Dixon 2-2-2s – Premier, Ajax, etc.
 Sharp, Roberts 2-2-2s – Atlas, Eagle, and Lion
 Robert Stephenson locomotives – Morning Star and North Star
 Charles Tayleur 2-2-2s – Vulcan, Apollo, etc.

Daniel Gooch (1837 - 1864)
More conventional locomotives were soon ordered by Daniel Gooch when he was appointed as the railway's Locomotive Superintendent.  Following on from the Star Class that he ordered from Robert Stephenson and Company, he designed a series of standardised and successful locomotive types starting with the Firefly and Sun classes of passenger locomotives, and the Leo and Hercules classes for goods trains. By 1846, Swindon Works had been established and was able to build its own locomotives. The most familiar from this period are the Iron Duke Class 2-2-2s with their  driving wheels, a type that operated express trains right up to the end of the broad gauge in 1892. Gooch further developed the broad gauge locomotive fleet, producing the first bogie tank design for the steep and curving South Devon lines in 1849, and condensing locomotives for the Metropolitan Railway in 1862. He produced over 100 Ariadne class goods locomotives to a standardised design at a time when most classes ran to only ten or twenty locomotives, and components he designed were often interchangeable between different classes.

With the acquisition of the northern standard gauge lines in 1854 came 56 locomotives, a second workshop at Wolverhampton, and Joseph Armstrong. Wolverhampton was responsible for maintaining standard gauge locomotives for many years, although Daniel Gooch did design some new locomotives that were built at Swindon and carried to Wolverhampton on special trucks. The first, the 57 class were 0-6-0 goods locomotives built in 1855. At the same time some 69 class passenger locomotives were built by Beyer, Peacock and Company in Manchester so were able to be transported on their own wheels. By the time that Armstrong replaced Gooch at Swindon in 1864 many more locomotives had been acquired with the Birkenhead and West Midland Railways.

Broad gauge
 Ariadne class 0-6-0
 Banking class 0-6-0ST
 Bogie class 4-4-0ST
 Caesar class 0-6-0
 Caliph class 0-6-0
 Firefly class 2-2-2
 Hercules class 0-6-0
 Iron Duke class 4-2-2
 Leo class 2-4-0
 Metropolitan class 2-4-0T
 Premier class 0-6-0
 Prince class 2-2-2
 Pyracmon class 0-6-0
 Sir Watkin class 0-6-0T
 Star Class 2-2-2
 Sun class 2-2-2
 Victoria class 2-4-0
 Waverley class 4-4-0

Standard gauge

 57 Class 0-6-0
 69 Class 2-2-2
 77 and 167 Classes 0-6-0
 79 Class 0-6-0
 91 Class 0-4-0ST
 93 Class 0-6-0T
 131 Class 0-6-0
 "Sharps" or 157 Class 2-2-2
 "England" or "Chancellor" Class 2-4-0
 320 Class 2-4-0WT
 322 or "Beyer" Class 0-6-0

Joseph Armstrong (Wolverhampton 1854 - 1864, Swindon 1864 - 1877)
In 1864 Gooch was succeeded by Joseph Armstrong who brought his standard gauge experience gained in the Northern Division to bear on the larger broad gauge locomotives. He designed the Hawthorn class of 2-4-0 and, in 1870, started the renewal of the Iron Dukes with more powerful boilers. The conversion of many broad gauge lines to standard gauge meant that this was a period of consolidation but in 1876 the amalgamation of the Bristol and Exeter and South Devon Railway locomotives saw 180 locomotives added to the GWR's fleet. To replace some of these earlier locomotives, Armstrong put broad gauge wheels on his standard gauge 1076 Class and from this time on GWR locomotives were given numbers rather than the names that had been carried by broad gauge locomotives up till then.

Armstrong developed the 2-2-2 as his preferred express locomotive, producing 30 of the Sir Daniel class from 1866 and 21 of the Queen class from 1873. Smaller 2-4-0s, such as the 439 class of 1868, worked slower passenger trains while 0-6-0s, such as the 388 class, continued to operate freight trains. Tank locomotives were constructed to operate lighter trains and branch lines, the most familiar of which were the 1076 "Buffalo" class 0-6-0STs (later 0-6-0PT), and the 455 "Metro" class 2-4-0Ts.

Broad gauge
 Hawthorn class 2-4-0, later 2-4-0ST
 Swindon class 0-6-0
 Rover class 4-2-2
 Standard goods 0-6-0
 1076 Class 0-6-0ST

Standard gauge
 Queen/Sir Alexander Class 2-2-2
 Sir Daniel Class 2-2-2
 7/8/30/32/110 Class 2-2-2
 17 Class 2-4-0ST
 56/717 Class 2-4-0
 111 Class 2-4-0
 302 Class 0-6-0ST
 360 Class 0-6-0
 388 Class "Standard Goods" 0-6-0
 439 "Bicycle" Class 2-4-0
 455 Class 2-4-0T
 481 Class 2-4-0
 806 Class 2-4-0
 927 Class "Coal Goods" 0-6-0
 1076 Class 'Buffalo' 0-6-0ST

George Armstrong (Wolverhampton 1864 - 1897)
After his brother was promoted to Swindon, George Armstrong took his place at Wolverhampton and for the next 33 years continued to repair, rebuild and build standard-gauge locomotives in a spirit of independence from Swindon, just as Joseph had done during his own ten years at Wolverhampton. Most of the new locomotives built there were tank engines, some of them very long-lived; a few even survived the Second World War.
 34 Class 0-6-0
 108 Class 2-4-0
 119 Class 0-6-0ST
 322 Class 0-6-0ST
 517 Class 0-4-2T
 633 Class 0-6-0T
 645 Class 0-6-0ST
 655 Class 0-6-0ST
 850 Class 0-6-0ST
 1016 Class 0-6-0ST
 1501 Class 0-6-0ST
 1901 Class 0-6-0ST

William Dean (1877 - 1902)
Joseph Armstrong's early death in 1877 meant that the final phase of broad gauge motive power was the responsibility of William Dean. He continued the Iron Duke renewal programme and added more convertibles, including some of Armstrong's 388 class goods locomotives. He also developed some elegant express locomotives such as the 3031 Class singles.  Following the abandonment of the broad gauge on 20 May 1892 the majority of the remaining 195 broad gauge locomotives were taken to "the dump" at Swindon. Most of the convertible locomotives were altered to run on the standard gauge over the following 18 months while the remainder were cut up.

Dean had worked under Armstrong on and off for 22 years before becoming his successor and he perpetuated his locomotive policy for some time. He later produced standardised 0-6-0 and 2-6-0 goods locomotives (the 2301 and 2600 "Aberdare" classes), and 0-6-0STs of various sizes (the 2021 and 2721 classes). For express trains he initially developed the 2-2-2 type, culminating with the elegant 3031 class. He later moved on to the 4-4-0 type, producing the Badminton and Atbara classes with  wheels, and the Duke and Bulldog classes with  wheels. For branch line and suburban trains he built 31 3600 class 2-4-2T locomotives.

Broad gauge
 Nos. 8, 14, 16 2-4-0
 3001 class 2-2-2
 3501 class 2-4-0T
 3521 class 0-4-2ST, later 0-4-4T

Standard gauge
The majority of saddle tanks were rebuilt with pannier tanks from 1902 onwards.
 No. 1 4-4-0T later 2-4-0T
 Nos. 7, 8, 14, 16 experimental 2-4-0, later 4-4-0
 No. 13 2-4-2T, later 4-4-0ST
 Nos. 17-19 0-6-4PT crane tanks (based on 850 Class)
 No. 36 4-6-0
 No. 45 0-4-0ST
 River (69 Class) 2-4-0
 Sharpies/Cobham (157 Class) 2-2-2
 1661 Class 0-6-0ST
 1813 Class 0-6-0ST
 1854 Class 0-6-0ST
 2021 Class 0-6-0ST
 2201 Class 2-4-0
 2301 Class 'Dean goods' 0-6-0
 2361 Class 0-6-0
 2600 Class 'Aberdare' 2-6-0
 2602 Class 'Kruger' 2-6-0, one of the prototypes a 4-6-0
 2721 Class 0-6-0ST
 3001 Class 2-2-2, later 4-2-2
 3031 Class 'Dean single' or 'Achilles' 4-2-2
 3201 Class 2-4-0
 3206 Class 'Barnum' 2-4-0
 3226 Class 2-4-0
 3232 Class 2-4-0
 3252 Class 'Duke' and 'Bird' 4-4-0
 3300 Class 'Bulldog' 4-4-0
 3501 Class ex-broad gauge 2-4-0T
 3521 Class 0-4-2T, later 0-4-4T then 4-4-0 (some tank locomotives ex-broad gauge)
 3571 Class 0-4-2T
 3600 Class 2-4-2T
 4100 Class 'Badminton', 'Atbara', and 'Flower' 4-4-0
 4120 Class 'Atbara' 4-4-0
 4149 Class 'Flower' 4-4-0

George Jackson Churchward (1902-1922)

George Jackson Churchward started his railway career in the South Devon Railway locomotive workshops at Newton Abbot. After that company became a part of the GWR in 1876 he was sent to Swindon and worked under Armstrong and Dean. After his appointment as Locomotive Superintendent in 1902 he developed a series of standard locomotive types with flat-topped Belpaire fireboxes, tapered boilers, long smokeboxes, boiler top feeds, long-lap long-travel valve gear, and many standardised parts such as wheels, cylinders and connecting rods.

For express passenger trains he quickly turned out the City class of 4-4-0s, the first taking to the rails in 1903. The following year one of these, 3717 City of Truro, was reputedly the first locomotive in the world to exceed 100 mph. A larger 4-4-0 was produced in 1904 in the form of the County class, but further increases in size demanded more wheels.

Experiments had already been made for a 4-6-0 design while Dean was still in charge, and these continued under Churchward; the first 4-6-0, number 100, appeared in 1902 as the initial prototype of what became the Saint class. One locomotive was converted to a 4-4-2 for direct trials against French designs that he tried on the GWR in 1903. These experiments moved the GWR towards using four cylinders and they even tried a 4-6-2, 111 The Great Bear which was the first locomotive of this type in the United Kingdom. Production 4-6-0s appeared in 1905 as the two-cylinder Saint class, and were followed in 1906 by the four-cylinder Star class. A freight version of the Saint, the 2-8-0 2800 class was introduced in 1903. For lighter trains a series of 2-6-0s were turned out in 1911, the 4300 class, which were to become the most numerous GWR tender locomotives. In 1919 this design was enlarged to become the 4700 class 2-8-0s.

Churchward's standardisation aims meant that a number of tank locomotives were produced that were based on these tender locomotives. The 2221 class of 1905 were a 4-4-2 tank version of the County class, indeed they were known as the "County Tanks". These were then developed into a 2-6-2T design, being produced as the 3100 class in 1903 and the 3150 class three years later. Smaller 2-6-2Ts, the 4400 class were introduced in 1904 and were succeeded by the slightly larger 4500 class in 1906. Two very different freight tank locomotive types appeared in 1910. The 4200 class was a tank version of the 2800 class, but a demand for small locomotives for working on dock and branch lines was met by the 1361 class, a new design based on the old Cornwall Minerals Railway 0-6-0ST design but using as many of Churchward's standard parts as possible.

Other innovations during Churchward's office included the introduction of self-propelled Steam Rail Motors for suburban and light branch line passenger trains.  From 1915 his post was renamed that of the 'Chief Mechanical Engineer'.  He also remodelled Swindon Works, building the  boiler-erecting shops and the first static locomotive-testing plant in the United Kingdom.

 101 Class 0-4-0T (oil burning): 101
 The Great Bear (4-6-2): 111
 1361 Class (0-6-0 ST): 1361–1365
 County Tank Class (4-4-2T): 2221–2250
 2800 Class (2-8-0): 2800–2883
 Saint Class (4-6-0): 2900–2955, 2971-2990, 2998
 3100 Class (2-6-2 T): 31xx (later 51xx)
 3150 Class (2-6-2 T): 3150–3190
 City Class (4-4-0): 3700–3719
 County Class (4-4-0): 3800–3839
 Star Class (4-6-0): 4000–4072
 4200 Class (2-8-0 T): 4200–4299, 5200–5204
 4300 Class (2-6-0): 4300-4399, 5300-5399, 6300-6399, 7300-7321, 8300-8399, 9300-9320
 4400 Class (2-6-2 T): 4400–4410
 4500 Class (2-6-2 T): 4500–4574
 4600 Class (4-4-2 T): 4600
 4700 Class (2-8-0): 4700–4708
 Steam railmotors
 Petrol-electric railcar

Charles Collett (1922-1941)
Charles Collett became the Chief Mechanical Engineer in 1921. Almost straight away he had to take on all the locomotives of myriad types from the railways absorbed in 1922 and 1923. Many of these were 'Swindonised', that is they were rebuilt using standard GWR parts. He also set about designing many new types to replace the older examples. Many of the most familiar GWR tank locomotive classes were designed during this period: the 1400 class for small branch lines and auto trains; the 4575 class (a development of the 4500 class with larger tanks) and the large 6100 class 2-6-2Ts; the massive 7200 class of rebuilt 4200 class 2-8-2Ts; and the iconic pannier tanks of the 5700 class, the first of which appeared in 1929.

Collett further developed the 4-6-0 type as the ideal GWR express locomotive, extending the Stars into Castles in 1923, and then producing the largest of them all, the four-cylinder King class, in 1927. He also produced slightly smaller types for mixed traffic (either passenger and goods) duties, the Hall class in 1928, the Grange class in 1934, and the Manor class in 1934. All these continued to carry appropriate names. For lighter goods services he produced his own standard 0-6-0, the 2251 class.

It was under Collett's control that diesel power first appeared on the GWR. He introduced the first streamlined rail cars in 1934 and by 1942 38 had been built, although the latter ones had more angular styling. Some were configured for long distance express services with buffet counters, others for branch line or parcels work, and some were designed as two-car sets.

 Sentinel geared locomotive (0-4-0 TG): 12
 1101 Class (0-4-0 T): 1101–1106
 1366 Class (0-6-0 PT): 1366–1371
 1400 Class (0-4-2 T): 1400–1474 (renumbered 1946 from corresponding numbers in 48xx group – below)
 2251 Class (0-6-0): 2200–2299, 3200–3219
 2884 Class (2-8-0): 2884–2899, 3800–3866
 3100 Class (2-6-2 T): 3100–3104
 Earl or Dukedog Class (4-4-0): 3200–3228, 3265 (later 9000–9028, 9065)
 Castle Class (4-6-0): 4073–4099, 5000–5099, 7000–7037
 4575 Class (2-6-2 T): 4575–4599, 5500–5574
 4800 Class (0-4-2 T): 4800–4874 (later 1400–1474)
 Hall Class (4-6-0): 4900–4999, 5900–5999, 6900–6958
 5101 Class (2-6-2 T): 5101–5199, 4100–4179
 5205 Class (2-8-0 T): 5205–5264
 5400 Class (0-6-0 PT): 5400–5424
 5600 Class (0-6-2 T): 5600–5699, 6600–6699
 5700 Class (0-6-0 PT): 57xx, 67xx, 77xx, 87xx, 97xx, 36xx, 37xx, 46xx, 96xx
 5800 Class (0-4-2 T): 5800–5819
 King Class (4-6-0): 6000–6029
 6100 Class (2-6-2 T): 6100–6169
 6400 Class (0-6-0 PT): 6400–6439
 Grange Class (4-6-0):6800–6879
 7200 Class (2-8-2 T): 7200–7253
 7400 Class (0-6-0 PT): 7400–7449
 Manor Class (4-6-0): 7800–7829
 8100 Class  (2-6-2 T): 8100–8109
 GWR diesel shunters: Diesel shunters 1 and 2
 GWR railcars: Diesel railcars 1–38

Frederick Hawksworth (1941-1949)
Frederick Hawksworth only became the Chief Mechanical Engineer in 1941 and the Second World War meant that his new designs were few. He updated Collett's Hall class to produce the GWR 6959 Class, known as "Modified Halls", and produced the last GWR 2-cylinder 4-6-0s, the County class 4-6-0, which ended a tradition that had begun with the Saint class 42 years before. Their boilers were based on those of the LMS Stanier Class 8F 2-8-0, a number of which had been built at Swindon during the War. Other designs included three designs of 0-6-0PT: the taper boilered 9400 class; the 1500 class with outside Walschaerts valve gear and no running plate designed for pilot work around large stations; and the very light 1600 Class.

 County Class (4-6-0): 1000–1029
 1500 Class (0-6-0 PT): 1500–1509
 1600 Class (0-6-0 PT): 1600–1669
 Modified Hall Class (4-6-0): 6959–6999, 7900–7929
 9400 Class (0-6-0 PT): 9400–9499, 8400–8499, 3400–3409
 GWR diesel shunters: Diesel shunters 501-507 (Introduced as BR 15101-15107)
 GWR Gas turbine-electric locomotives, introduced as British Rail 18000 and British Rail 18100

Locomotives of amalgamated companies (1854 - 1920)

Bristol and Exeter Railway
Bristol and Exeter Railway locomotives were absorbed on 1 January 1876. The broad gauge locomotives were numbered in the series 2001 to 2095; the standard gauge locomotives were numbered in the series 1353 – 1382.
 1353 – 1382 standard gauge locomotives
 2001 – 2004 Broad gauge 8 feet 10 inch 4-2-4T
 2005 – 2006 Broad gauge 8 feet 10 inch 4-2-4T
 2007 – 2014 Broad gauge 4-2-2
 2015 – 2024 Broad gauge 2-4-0
 2025 – 2027 Convertible 2-4-0
 2028 – 2053 Broad gauge 4-4-0ST
 2054 – 2057 Broad gauge 2-2-2T
 2058 ex-South Wales Mineral Railway broad gauge 0-4-2T
 2059 – 2076 Broad gauge 0-6-0
 2077 – 2090 ex-GWR Swindon Class 0-6-0
 2091 Broad gauge 0-6-0T
 2092 – 2093 Broad gauge 0-6-0ST
 2094 – 2095 Broad gauge 0-4-0T

Bristol Port Railway & Pier
Jointly vested with the Midland Railway from 1 September 1890.
Opened on 6 March 1865, the line was worked by the contractor Waring Bros until 1869 when the company was left to make its own arrangements. Two locomotives were owned by the company but never taken into stock of either the Great Western Railway or the Midland Railway.  They were 0-4-2Ts which appear to have been rebuilt from ex-London and North Western Railway tender engines.

Carmarthen and Cardigan Railway
Carmarthen & Cardigan Railway was amalgamated with the Great Western Railway on 1 July 1881.
Three locomotives (+ 1)
 1 645 Class 0-6-0ST/0-6-0PT, WPN No 196, GWR No (1881) 902, bought November 1872
 2 645 Class 0-6-0ST/0-6-0PT, WPN No 194, GWR No (1881) 903, bought October 1872
 3 645 Class 0-6-0ST/0-6-0PT, WPN No 189, GWR No (1881) 904, bought May 1876
 Victor Fossick & Hackworth, Wks No 176, built 1864 ex Llanelly Railway, 0-6-0, bought December 1872

Cornwall Minerals Railway
Nine locomotives were transferred from the Cornwall Mineral Railway on 1 July 1877, and one further one on 1 July 1896.
 1388 Peckett and Sons 0-6-0ST (1896)
 1392 – 1400 Sharp Stewart and Company 0-6-0T (1877)

Festiniog & Blaenau Railway
This railway was of 1' 11½" gauge and was taken over on 13 April 1883.  It was later converted to standard gauge as the extension of the new Bala & Festiniog Railway after purchase by the Great Western Railway.
Two locomotives were taken over, both being built by Manning Wardle.
 1 Manning Wardle Wks No 259, 0-4-2ST, built 1868
 2 Manning Wardle Wks No 260, 0-4-2ST, built 1868

Hook Norton Ironstone Partnership
This concern was in liquidation when the Great Western Railway purchased an engine in July 1904.
 Hook Norton, Manning Wardle, Wks No 1127, 0-6-0ST, built in November 1889.  Eventually sold to the Fishguard & Rosslare Railways & Harbours Company in September 1907, it came back into GW Stock in October 1913 and lasted until January 1926.  Given GW No 1337.

Liskeard and Caradon Railway
Three locomotives were acquired on 1 January 1909, they were used on both the Caradon and the Liskeard and Looe Railways. GWR experimental 4-4-0ST number 13 was also regularly used on the line, at first hired to the Liskeard and Caradon, but it continued to be used after the Great Western Railway took over operations.
 1308 Lady Margret – an Andrew Barclay Sons & Co. 2-4-0T
 1311 Cheesewring – a Gilkes Wilson and Company 0-6-0ST
 1312 Kilmar – a Hopkins Gilkes and Company 0-6-0ST

Llanelly Railway
The 21 locomotives acquired in 1873 were renumbered into the 894 – 914 series.

Llynvi and Ogmore Railway
12 locomotives were acquired in 1873, including four which had originated on the West Cornwall Railway. They were renumbered in the 915 – 926 series.

Manchester and Milford Railway
Seven locomotives were acquired by the Great Western Railway
 3 Lady Elizabeth, Sharp Stewart 2-4-0 Wks No 1756, delivered in July 1866.  Allocated GW No 1305, it was sold immediately.
 4 Aberystwyth, Manning Wardle 0-6-0 Wks No 255, delivered in July 1868. Given GW No 1339, withdrawn December 1906.
 5, Sharp Stewart 0-6-0 Wks No 2036 in July 1870.  Allocated 1340 but withdrawn in August 1906.
 2 Plynlimmon, Sharp Stewart 2-4-2T Wks No 3710.  Given GW No 1304 and lasted until July 1916.
 6 Cader Idris, Sharp Stewart 2-4-2T Wks No 4128.  Given GW No 1306 and lasted until April 1919.
 7, London & North Western Railway 0-6-0 built at Crewe in November 1889 as L&NWR 1095.  Given GW No 1341 and lasted until November 1906.
 1, London & North Western Railway 0-6-0 built at Crewe in August 1880 as L&NWR 2387.  Given GW No 1338 and lasted until December 1915.
 8, Great Western Railway 2301 Class (Dean Goods) 0-6-0 (ex GW 2301) on loan from summer 1905.
 9, Great Western Railway 2301 Class (Dean Goods) 0-6-0 (ex GW 2351) on loan from summer 1905.
 10, Great Western Railway 2301 Class (Dean Goods) 0-6-0 (ex GW 2532) on loan from summer 1905.

Monmouthshire Railway 
53 (+1) locomotives were taken over in 1875.  They were renumbered into the 1301 – 1352 series.
Worked from 1 August 1875, amalgamated 1 August 1880.
 1 Grylls & Co built 1847 0-8-0
 2, 3, 4, 5 Neath Abbey Ironworks built 1848, 0-6-0
 6, 7, 8 (GWR 1315-1317) Stothert, Slaughter & Co built 1847, delivered 1849, 0-6-0
 9, 10 (GWR 1302 & 1301) Sharp Brothers built 1849, 2-4-0WT
 11 (purchased from the contractors Waring & Son 1849) possibly 0-4-0

North Pembrokeshire & Fishguard Railway
Taken over July 1898.
3 locomotives (all 0-6-0STs).
 Precelly, Hudswell Clarke, Wks No 175, built January 1875, given GW No 1379 and sold in March 1907.
 Ringing Rock, Manning Wardle, Wks No 630, built in 1876, given GW No 1380 and eventually ended up at the Kent & East Sussex Railway as their No 8 Hesperus until 1941.
 Margaret, Fox, Walker and Company, Wks No 410 was built in November 1878 and given GW No 1378.  Sold in 1910 to the Gwendraeth Valleys Railway as their No 2 in July 1910.  When the Great Western Railway took over that concern, they did not take it into stock but sold it to the Kidwelly Timplate Co. Ltd. in March 1923.  It carried a GW Registration Plate No 73 of 1911 and ceased work in 1941.  It has since been preserved in a non-operating condition and can be seen at Scolton Manor Museum near Haverfordwest, Pembrokeshire, not far from its original line.

Pembroke and Tenby Railway
8 locomotives acquired on 1 July 1896.
 1360 Tenby, 1361 Milford Sharp Stewart 2-2-2T
 1362 Pembroke Sharp Stewart 2-4-0
(NB ?? Re number 1361 – An extant photo exists in the SLS Stanford Jacobs Collection showing 1361 to be Pembroke.)
 1363 Owen, 1364 Davies, 1365 Cambria later Tenby Sharp Stewart 0-6-0
 1813 Holmwood Great Western Railway 1813 class 0-6-0T
 3201 Stella Great Western Railway Stella class 2-4-0
 Llandinam, a Manning Wardle 0-6-0ST was owned by David Davies and used in the construction of the line.  It was removed by him before the directors took over in 1870.
 Further reading can be found at http://members.lycos.co.uk/Graham_Davies/Railways/PandTR.html

Severn & Wye and Severn Bridge Railway
The railway was vested jointly between the Great Western Railway and the Midland Railway on 1 July 1894 .
Seven locomotives were taken over on 1 October 1895.
 Will Scarlet, Fletcher, Jennings & Co. Wks No 122, 0-6-0T was given GW No 1356.
 Little John, Fletcher, Jennings & Co. Wks No 140, 0-6-0T went to the Midland Railway as their 1123A
 Alan-a-dale, Fletcher, Jennings & Co. Wks No 157, 0-6-0T was given GW No 1355
 Maid Marian, Avonside Engine Co. Wks No 940, 0-6-0T was given GW No 1357
 Ranger, a 0-6-0 tender engine was altered to a ST by the Avonside Engine Co. in January 1891 and given GW No 1358
 Wye, Fletcher, Jennings & Co. Wks No 153, 0-6-0ST became GW No 1359
 Severn Bridge, Vulcan Foundry Wks No 860, 0-6-0T, was given GW No 1354
 Gaveller, Vulcan Foundry Wks No 1309, 0-6-0T, was given GW No 1353
 Sharpness, Vulcan Foundry Wks No 850, 0-6-0T, went to the Midland Railway as their 1124A
 Sabrina, Vulcan Foundry Wks No 953, 0-6-0T, went to the Midland Railway as their 1125A
 Forester, Vulcan Foundry Wks No 1163, 0-6-0T, went to the Midland Railway as their 1126A

South Devon Railway
The 85 broad gauge locomotives added to the Great Western Railway fleet on 1 February 1876 included not just the South Devon Railway locomotives but also the 19 owned by the Cornwall Railway and 8 from the West Cornwall Railway, which had all operated in a common pool since 1866. They were numbered in the 2096 – 2180 series but, generally, also retained their names.
 1298 – 1300 Three 2-4-0Ts completed by the GWR as standard gauge
 2096 – 2105 4-4-0ST Comet class
 2106 – 2121 4-4-0ST Eagle class
 2122 – 2127 4-4-0ST Gorgon class
 2128 – 2131 4-4-0ST Leopard class
 2132 – 2135 ex-Carmarthen and Cardigan Railway 4-4-0ST
 2136 2-4-0ST
 2137 2-4-0ST Prince
 2138 ex-Great Western Railway Banking class 0-6-0ST
 2139 – 2142 0-6-0ST Tornado class
 2143 – 2144 0-6-0ST Dido class
 2145 – 2147 ex-Llynvi Valley Railway 0-6-0ST
 2148 – 2153 0-6-0ST Dido class
 2154 – 2155 0-6-0ST Remus class
 2156 0-6-0ST
 2157-2159 ex-Great Western Railway Sir Watkin class 0-6-0ST
 2160 – 2169 0-6-0ST Buffalo class (later rebuilt as standard gauge No.s 1317 – 1325)
 2170 0-6-0ST Taurus
 2171 2-4-0T King
 2172 – 2174 0-4-0WT Owl class (later standard gauge 1327 – 1328)
 2175 – 2179 0-4-0ST Raven class (later standard gauge 1329 – 1333)
 2180 0-4-0vb Tiny

Torbay and Brixham Railway
Vested with the Great Western Railway 1 January 1883.
Two broad gauge engines: Queen and Raven.  The former was withdrawn from stock on the same day, the latter was an ex-South Devon Railway locomotive and was taken back into GWR stock.

Vale of Neath Railway
The 19 broad gauge locomotives acquired in 1866 retained their original numbers; the six standard gauge locomotives were renumbered into the 413 – 418 series.
 1-6 Broad gauge 4-4-0STs
 7-19 Broad gauge 0-6-0STs
 413 – 418 standard gauge locomotives

Watlington & Princes Risborough Railway
Opened on 15 August 1872 and is believed to have been worked with a locomotive on hire from the Great Western Railway.
The line was vested into the Great Western Railway on 1 July 1883.
Two locomotives were taken over.
 1 Sharp Stewart, 2-2-2WT.  It is believed that it may have been SS Wks No 1016 of 1857, ex Furness Railway No 11.
 2 Sharp Stewart. 2-4-0T, Wks No 2578 became GWR 1384.

Whitland & Cardigan Railway
There were three locomotives all standard gauge and were numbered 1385-1387, being taken over 1 September 1886.
 1385 John Owen Fox, Walker and Company Wks No 170, 0-6-0ST built 1872
 1386 Fox, Walker and Company Wks No 271, 0-6-0ST, built 1875
 1387 Fox, Walker and Company Wks No 340, 0-6-0ST, built 1877

West Cornwall Railway
The eight West Cornwall Railway broad gauge locomotives were operated in a common pool with the South Devon Railway locomotives and are detailed in that section, above. At the same time, 1 February 1876, another eight standard gauge locomotives were also acquired. These were renumbered 1384 – 1391.
 1384 Robert Stephenson and Company 2-4-0
 1385 Robert Stephenson and Company 0-6-0
 1386 Vulcan Foundry 0-6-0ST
 1387 ex-London North Western Railway 0-6-0
 1388 ex-London North Western Railway 0-6-0
 1389 ex-London North Western Railway 0-6-0
 1390 ex-London North Western Railway 0-6-0
 1391 Avonside Engine Company 0-4-0ST

Locomotives from the ROD (1919 - 1925)
In 1919, the GWR purchased 20 ROD 2-8-0 locomotives from the Railway Operating Division. These were based on Robinson's GCR Class 8K. Another 84 locomotives of the same class were hired in 1919–20 but were returned in 1921–22. In 1925, a further 80 locomotives of the same class were purchased, of which nineteen were among those previously hired.

 3000 Class (2-8-0): 3000–3099

Locomotives of amalgamated companies (1920 - 1924)
Eighteen companies were merged between 1 January 1922 and 1 January 1924 under the provisions of the Railways Act 1921, bringing 925 locomotives.

Alexandra (Newport and South Wales) Docks and Railway
39 locomotives acquired on 1 January 1922.

Barry Railway
148 Barry Railway locomotives acquired on 1 January 1922 and given random numbers in several series.

Brecon and Merthyr Railway
47 locomotives acquired on 1 July 1922.

Burry Port and Gwendraeth Valley Railway
15 locomotives acquired on 1 July 1922.

Cambrian Railways
94 standard gauge locomotives acquired on 1 January 1922 given random numbers in various series..

Vale of Rheidol Railway
Three  gauge locomotives acquired with the Cambrian Railways on 1 January 1922, also two new locomotives, similar to the earlier 2-6-2Ts, built in 1923.

Welshpool and Llanfair Light Railway
Two  gauge 0-6-0T locomotives acquired with the Cambrian Railways on 1 January 1922.

Cardiff Railway
36 locomotives acquired on 1 January 1922.

Cleobury Mortimer and Ditton Priors Light Railway
Two locomotives were acquired on 1 January 1922

Gwendraeth Valleys Railway
2 0-6-0ST locomotives were acquired on 1 January 1923. One was given a GWR number, but the second (Margaret) was sold without being allocated a GWR number.

Llanelly and Mynydd Mawr Railway
8 locomotives acquired on 1 January 1923.

Midland and South Western Junction Railway
The M&SWJR's Locomotive Superintendent from 1903 to 1923 was James Tyrell.

29 locomotives acquired on 1 January 1923.

The three Dübs 2-4-0s were the only M&SWJR locomotives to survive into British Railways ownership in 1948. At least one of them was used on the Lambourn Valley Railway, probably because of its light axle load.

Neath and Brecon Railway
15 locomotives acquired on 1 July 1922.

Port Talbot Railway and Docks Company
22 locomotives acquired on 1 January 1922.

Powlesland and Mason
Powlesland and Mason were contractors at Swansea Docks, and their 9 locomotives were acquired on 1 January 1924.

Rhondda and Swansea Bay Railway
37 locomotives acquired on 1 January 1922.

Rhymney Railway
123 locomotives acquired on 1 January 1922 given numbers in random series.

South Wales Mineral Railway
5 locomotives acquired on 1 January 1923.

Swansea Harbour Trust
14 locomotives acquired on 1 July 1923.

Taff Vale Railway
The Taff Vale Railway and its 275 locomotives were acquired on 1 January 1922.

Locomotives of amalgamated companies (1925 - 1947)

Corris Railway
 narrow gauge locomotives:
No. 3 0-4-2 ST
No. 4 0-4-2 ST

Weston, Clevedon and Portishead Railway
Two locomotives were transferred to the Great Western Railway when Weston, Clevedon and Portishead Railway closed in 1940:
 GWR No.5 ex-LB&SCR A1 Class 0-6-0T "Portishead"
 GWR No.6 ex-LB&SCR A1 Class 0-6-0T

Ystalyfera Tin Works
 GWR No.1 Peckett and Sons 0-4-0ST "Hercules"

1948 and after
On 1 January 1948 all existing GWR locomotives became the property of the new British Railways (BR); unlike other companies stock, all the steam locomotives continued to carry their GWR numbers. BR continued to build GWR designs (the 1000, 1500, 1600, 4073 and 6959 classes in particular) for a while. When the first BR Standard steam locomotives started to arrive, they were often compared unfavourably to ex-GWR locos, and the Western Region decided to take forward experiments with diesel-hydraulic and gas turbine locomotives.

Withdrawal of ex-GWR locomotives took place earlier than for the other 'Big Four' companies as the Western Region took the decision to be the first to end steam traction. A handful of locomotives that had been transferred to other regions did survive for longer however. Ironically, because the Barry scrapyard received large numbers of ex-GWR locomotives, proportionately more survive today in preservation than the locomotives of the other companies.

Named locomotives
Most express passenger locomotives carried distinctive names, generally following themes such as kings (the 6000 class), cities (3700 class), counties (3800 class, later the 1000 class), castles (4073 class), and halls (4900 class). This tradition dated back to the first locomotives delivered to the railway, for all broad gauge locomotives initially were identified only by names, numbers first appearing on the standard gauge locomotives acquired with the northern companies that became part of the GWR in 1862.

Several locomotives were honoured with the name Great Western. The first was an Iron Duke class broad gauge locomotive built in 1846, the first locomotive entirely constructed at the company's Swindon locomotive works. This was withdrawn in 1870, but in 1888 a modernised version of the same class was built and given the same name; this was withdrawn just four years later when the broad gauge was taken out of use.  A standard gauge 3031 class locomotive, number 3012, was then given the Great Western name. The final GWR locomotive to carry the name was Castle class number 7007, which continued to carry while working for British Railways. The tradition of using this name has continued with British Rail and modern companies up to the present day.

Preservation 

More than 140 Great Western locomotives (including some designed by the GWR but built by British Railways) have been preserved. They are mostly in museums or on heritage railways in the United Kingdom, predominantly in the area formerly served by the GWR. Some locomotives that were absorbed in the 1923 grouping also survive today.

Dean designed locomotives

Churchward designed locomotives 

* Named in preservation

Collett designed locomotives 

Collet also built or rebuilt the Vale Of Rheidol locomotives listed under § Narrow gauge locomotives.

Hawksworth designed locomotives

Amalgamated/pre-grouping locomotives 
Nine pre-grouping locomotives that were absorbed into the GWR in 1923 are known to survive: 
Narberth Road and Maenclochog Railway 0-6-0ST built by Fox, Walker & Company in 1878, NP&FR in 1894, GVR in 1911, GWR No. 1378. 
Alexandra Docks 0-4-0ST Trojan built by Avonside in 1897, GWR No. 1340. 
Taff Vale Railway O1 class 0-6-2T No. 28 built by TVR Cardiff West in 1897, GWR No. 450. 
Cardiff Railway 0-4-0ST No. 5 built by Kitson & Co in 1898, GWR No. 1338. 
Taff Vale Railway O2 class 0-6-2T No. 85 built by Neilson, Reid & Co. in 1899, GWR No. 426. 
Port Talbot Railway 0-6-0ST No. 26 built by Hudswell Clarke in 1900, GWR No. 813
Powlesland and Mason 0-4-0ST No. 6 built by Brush Electrical in 1906, GWR No. 921. 
Swansea Harbour Trust 0-4-0ST No. 13 built by Hawthorn Leslie in 1909, GWR No. 974.

BP&GVR No.2 Pontyberem was sold in 1914 by the company and into industrial use and therefore didn't pass into GWR ownership but was based at DRC for a while.

Narrow gauge locomotives 
Three locomotives of  gauge were acquired from the Vale of Rheidol Railway as part of the Cambrian Railways at the grouping, but only one survived to be privatised from British Rail in 1989:
2-6-2T VoR no. 2 (originally named Prince of Wales) built by Davies and Metcalfe in 1902, to GWR no. 1213 in 1922, rebuilt 1924, renumbered 9 by British Railways in 1949 and named Prince of Wales in 1956. Still in service.
Two more, similar to no. 1213 as rebuilt, were built by the GWR at Swindon in 1923:
2-6-2T No. 7 built by GWR in 1923, named Owain Glyndŵr in 1956 by British Railways
2-6-2T No. 8 built by GWR in 1923, named Llywelyn in 1956 by British Railways
These two, together with no. 9, are still running on their original line.

From the  gauge Welshpool and Llanfair Light Railway, absorbed into the GWR as part of the Cambrian Railways at the grouping:
0-6-0T No 822 The Earl built by Beyer, Peacock & Co. in 1902, preserved as No 822 The Earl on the WLLR
0-6-0T No 823 The Countess (renamed Countess by GWR) built by Beyer, Peacock & Co. in 1902, preserved as No 823 Countess on the WLLR

From the  gauge Corris Railway, which was purchased by the GWR in 1930:
0-4-2ST No. 3 built by Hughes Falcon in 1878, preserved as Sir Haydn on the Talyllyn Railway.
0-4-2ST No. 4 built by Kerr, Stuart and Company in 1921, preserved as Edward Thomas on the Talyllyn Railway.

See also 

 GWR locomotive numbering and classification
 List of 7-foot gauge railway locomotive names
 List of GWR broad gauge locomotives
 List of GWR standard classes with two outside cylinders
 Steam locomotives of British Railways
 GWR 0-4-0ST
 GWR 0-6-0PT

References

Sources
 The ABC of Great Western Locomotives (Ian Allan Ltd 7th Edition) (?)1945

 
 
 
 

 
 
Great Western
Great Western